Alice Naber-Lozeman (born 7 May 1971) is a Dutch Olympic eventing rider. She competed at the 2016 Summer Olympics in Rio de Janeiro where she finished 32nd in the individual and 6th in the team competition.

Naber-Lozeman also competed at three editions of European Eventing Championships (in 1999, 2003 and 2015). Her best result came in 2015, when she placed 4th in the team eventing competition.

References

External links
 
 

Living people
1971 births
Dutch female equestrians
Equestrians at the 2016 Summer Olympics
Olympic equestrians of the Netherlands